Bairavaa  is a 2017 Indian Tamil-language action film written and directed by Bharathan, and produced by B. Venkatarama Reddy. The film stars Vijay as the titular debt collector who takes on a criminal masquerading as an education philanthropist. The film co-stars Keerthy Suresh, Jagapathi Babu, Daniel Balaji, Sathish, Thambi Ramaiah, Mime Gopi, Sija Rose, Harish Uthaman, and Aparna Vinod. The music is composed by Santhosh Narayanan, the editing is by Praveen K. L., production design by M. Prabhaharan and the cinematography is handled by M. Sukumar. After entering production in early 2016, the film progressed under the tentative title of Vijay 60, before being named as Bairavaa during September 2016.

The film had a worldwide release on 12 January 2017. The film received mixed reviews with praise for Vijay's performance, action sequences, dialogues, soundtrack and score. The film completed a 50-day theatrical run and performed well financially.

Plot
Bairavaa is a collection agent for ICICI Bank in Chennai, who is willing to employ even violent means to get back money from debtors. During his manager's daughter's wedding, he comes across Malarvizhi, a medical student from Kallidaikurichi in Tirunelveli district, and falls in love with her. When he goes to the Koyambedu bus station to propose his love to Malar before she leaves Chennai, he notices her cornered by a group of thugs who plan to kill her as she was allegedly involved in an attack on Union Minister's son Charan. However, they back off after receiving a call from Periyakannu alias PK from Tirunelveli, who tells them not to harm her. Bairavaa confronts Malar, who reveals why PK spared her life. Malar studies in PK Medical College in Tirunelveli, whose chairman is PK, a butcher-turned-influential gangster and politician who runs Tirunelveli along with his right-hand man Kottai Veeran. The college has no basic facilities, including a proper building and good doctors. Malar and her friend Vaishali lodged a complaint against the college to the MCI, who decided to blacklist the college after noting the poor facilities. 

To save his reputation, PK made a deal with the MCI officials to revoke the suspension in exchange for them to sleep with a girl from the college. Vaishali, who was the girl chosen by the officials, where she was found dead from next morning. Malar's father, who is a police officer begins the investigation into PK's involvement in Vaishali's death, but he too was killed by PK in retribution. After her father's death, Malar filed a petition against PK to court where the judge declared that Malar should not be expelled and must not be harmed till the case is resolved, even though she had filed the complaint against PK. Though PK respects the judge's decision, he harasses Malar indirectly through the college lecturers and cuts power and water supply of her locality. He plans to kill her once the verdict is declared in his favor. During the wedding, Malar had given the video evidence of Vaishali being assaulted to Charan since, Charan being a Union Minister's son would have access to the NIC where the video would be investigated. Charan was later attacked by PK's henchmen, who took the video evidence and put the blame on Malar. Bairavaa, on hearing Malar's story, decides to help her fight PK and get justice for Vaishali and leaves for Kallidaikurichi with her. Posing as an income tax officer, Bairavaa conducts a raid at PK's mansion, taking away all the evidence which holds PK responsible for Vaishali's death. PK soon realizes that Bairavaa is after him, and a cat-and-mouse game begins between Bairavaa and PK. In the process, PK gets back the evidence and destroys them, leaving Bairavaa with no evidence to implicate PK, though he manages to get five more days time from the court to get the required evidence. 

Meanwhile, Kottai Veeran's wife, who was terminally ill, died. Bairavaa decides to take advantage of Kottai Veeran's love for his wife to get him on his side and make him approver against PK. He switches PK's asthma inhaler with nitrous oxide. PK, who inadvertently inhales the gas before going to Kottai Veeran's wife's funeral, begins to laugh uncontrollably, even during the funeral, causing Kottai Veeran to turn against him and accept Bairavaa's offer of becoming approver. In revenge for betraying him, PK confronts Kottai Veeran and hacks him to death. Bairavaa decides that is the only way to seek justice for Malar and Vaishali is to kill PK. He frames PK for plotting to assassinate the Prime Minister of India while he is on the way to the Kudankulam Nuclear Power Plant. The news spreads all across India, and soon it is ordered to shoot PK on sight. PK, realizing that he is cornered, tries to kill Bairavaa before he dies, but Bairavaa manages to subdue him and escape. He then disguises himself as a NSG commando, where he blends in with the real NSG commandos, who have arrived at the building and kills PK. The verdict is declared in favor of Bairavaa and Malar. PK's henchmen are arrested, while the students of PK Medical College are shifted to another college. In a press conference, Bairavaa reveals the importance of education and other private colleges should also have basic facilities to educate the children.

Cast

Production

Pre Production 
Sources say that almost 10 directors have approached Vijay for his 60th film. Giving his time and thoughts to the directors and their stories, Vijay would soon make a decision, and it was also quoted that Vijay wants his every third film to bring him out of the comfort zone and experiment with diverse roles and genres. Adding to that list, the following are the storytellers were lined up: S. J. Suryah, Samuthirakani, Hari, Bharathan, Karthik Subbaraj, Mohan Raja, Prabhu Deva, and M. Sasikumar. It was earlier reported that S. J. Suryah had given his one-liner to Vijay, who has given his nod. It is also said that Suryah has signed A. R. Rahman to compose the music and the film was going to be produced by Chandraprakash Jain. More to the speculation, Bharathan has narrated his script, and Hari might direct the story funded by Vijaya Productions, who were also the producers of Ajith Kumar's Veeram, finally Bharathan was confirmed by the producers to direct the film.

Development 
In September 2015, Vijaya Productions signed on to finance a project directed by Bharathan, which would feature Vijay and Keerthy Suresh in the lead role. This is the first time Vijay and Keerthy Suresh act together. Aparna Vinod, who debuted in the Malayalam film Kohinoor, also plays a pivotal role in the film. Bharathan continued to write the script through late 2015, while it was announced that Vijay would join the team to start filming after the completion of his other venture, Theri (2016). The technical crew of the film includes Santhosh Narayanan as the music director, Praveen K. L. as the editor, M. Prabhaharan as the art director, Anal Arasu as the fight master, and lyrics taken care of by Vairamuthu.

Casting
Names of Miya George, Kajal Agarwal and Aishwarya Rajesh where making rounds for the female lead in the movie, with the former having clear dominance.After that, Keerthy Suresh and Aparna Vinod where finalised .
Alongside the lead actor, it was revealed that Sathish, Y. G. Mahendra, Sriman, Aparna Vinod, and Harish Uthaman would be a part of the film. Papri Ghosh has been signed as the third female lead after Keerthi Suresh and Aparna Vinod. It is also reported that Vijay would be donning dual roles in the film with one of the characters speaking Nellai Tamil dialect and the other character appearing with a tonsured head. The film would also have one more heroine for Vijay, who is kept under wraps. Malayali actress Aparna Vinod is the latest addition to the cast of this movie. The actress has signed on the dotted lines recently to play the second female lead in the flick. Speaking to the Times of India, Aparna has claimed that she never expected to bag such a big film project, and she is happy to be working with Vijay in the film. Talking about the role, she said, "She plays a village belle, a vital character that will carry the story forward." Meanwhile, it is said that the first look of "Bairavaa" along with the title will be out on the eve of Ganesh Chaturthi, 5 September 2016. Producer and actor R. K. Suresh was rumored to be the third villain in this movie, joining the likes of Jagapati Babu and Daniel Balaji.

Filming
The film began production in Chennai in early April 2016, and an introductory song for Vijay was shot in the city. In the first schedule, Vijay, comedian Sathish and heroine Keerthi Suresh were shot for their roles. The shooting for two song sequences has been completed in the first schedule. The first song was the colourful opening song which was choreographed by Dinesh master.

The first schedule of the movie took place at EVP, Poonamallee in a court set up on 11 April 2016, and the scene reportedly features Vijay, Jagapati Babu and others.

The temple set was erected in Binny Mills as a festival and the scene featured Vijay, Keerthi Suresh, Harish Uthaman, Sathish, Sija Rose, Thambi Ramaiah, and others. The choreographer of the songs was Dinesh.

Soundtrack 

Santhosh Narayanan was signed to compose the film's music and collaborated with Vijay and Bharathan for the first time. Vijay and Priyadarshini recorded a song for the film. The music album of Bairavaa was about to be released in a grand event on 25 December (Christmas) 2016. However, it was cancelled due to ex-chief minister Jayalalithaa's death and also the aftermath of Cyclone Vardah. The songs were launched digitally on 24 December 2016. IndiaGlitz rated the album 3 out of 5 and stated, "Bhairavaa is filled with action and Santhosh Narayanan has worked his magic again, as he has rolled out an album, which is always in tune with the mood of the movie's crux. Movie Crown Rated the album 2.5 out of 5 and stated the album has Santhosh Narayanan Touch and the makes the album as enjoyable. Behindwoods.com stated "Bairavaa is a fun filled album from Santhosh Narayanan" and rated the album 2.75 out of 5.

The song "Varlaam Varlaam Vaa Bairavaa" is played for a fight sequence in the 2017 Hindi film Golmaal Again.

Release and distribution
The Tamil Nadu theatrical rights of the movie were sold to Sri Green Productions. The Kerala theatrical rights of Bairavaa were sold for a record price of Rs. 7.3 crore to Ifar International. The satellite rights of the film were sold to Sun TV.

Critical reception
Times of India gave 2.5 stars out of 5 for the film.
Sify.com rated the movie 3 out of 5 and stated that "the movie keeps the audience entertained, thanks to the two intelligently choreographed action sequences (cricket stunt and the interval block) along with a touching flashback. As usual, Vijay once again proves his capability of carrying a film on his strong shoulders. Keerthy Suresh as a homely girl from Nellai, played her portions well. Bharathan's catchy punchlines that every mass dialogue of Ilayathalapathy receives the thundering response and makes the movie an engaging entertainer". Behindwoods rated the film 2.25 stars out of 5, with its verdict stating that "even Vijay's screen presence could not save a middling script". The Hindu rated it 2 out of 5 stars indicating "Bairavaa: masala movie without spice!" Ananda Vikatan rated the film 41 out of 100.

References

External links 
 

2017 films
2010s Tamil-language films
Indian action comedy films
2017 masala films
Films scored by Santhosh Narayanan
Films about rape in India
Films about corruption in India
Films about the education system in India
Medical-themed films
2017 action thriller films